Derobrachus agyleus is a species of beetle in the family Cerambycidae. It was described by Buquet in 1852.

References

Prioninae
Beetles described in 1852